Suiren (Suìrén, lit. "Flint Man") appears in Chinese mythology and some works which draw upon it. He is credited as a culture hero who introduced humans to the production of fire and its use for cooking. He was included on some ancient lists of the legendary Three August Ones, who lived long before Emperor Yao, Emperor Shun, and the Xia rulers of the earliest historical Chinese dynasty, even before the Yellow Emperor & Yandi. Suiren’s innovation by tradition has been using the wooden fire drill to create fire. Tradition holds that he ruled over China for 110 years.

Sources
He is mentioned in ten books from the Han dynasty or before. Those crediting him with the introduction of drilling wood for fire include three Confucian works (Bai Hu Tong, Zhong Lun, and Fengsu Tongyi), the legalist book by Han Feizi, and the historical textbook Gu San Fen. He is also mentioned more generally in the Zhuangzi or Chuang-tzu, in two of the Confucian “Outer Chapters” (Xunzi and Qianfu Lun), a legalist book (Guanzi), and an early etymological dictionary Shuowen Jiezi.

References

 
 
 

Three Sovereigns and Five Emperors